Moinul Hossain Chowdhury (died 10 October 2010) was a Bangladesh Army officer who served as the adjutant general of Bangladesh army and former advisor of the caretaker government.

Military career
Moinul Hossain Chowdhury fought in the Bangladesh Liberation war. He was awarded Bir Bikrom for his role in the war. He was adjutant general of Bangladesh army in 1975 when the president of Bangladesh Sheikh Mujib was killed in a military coup. Major Rashid one of the coup plotters tried to recruit him into planning the coup. He was appointed to the post of chief advisor of the Muktijoddha Sangsad by president Ziaur Rahman but was replaced by President Ershad. When President Ziaur Rahman was assassinated, it was his job to investigate the coup but he was sidelined by then Army chief General Hussain Muhammad Ershad. As a result, he did not sign order of inquiry which he was supposed to; Ershad ended up signing it. He died on 10 October 2010.

Post-military career
He was a diplomat and served as ambassador of Bangladesh to a number of countries. He served as an advisor in the caretaker Government of former Chief Justice Latifur Rahman.

Bibliography
He wrote Silent Witness of a General about his time in Bangladesh Army along with several newspaper articles, both in English and Bangla.

References

Year of birth missing
2010 deaths
Pakistan Military Academy alumni
Bangladesh Army generals
Advisors of Caretaker Government of Bangladesh
Recipients of the Bir Bikrom
Mukti Bahini personnel